Kalanchoe  , also written Kalanchöe or Kalanchoë, is a genus of about 125 species of tropical, succulent plants in the stonecrop family Crassulaceae, mainly native to Madagascar and tropical Africa.  A Kalanchoe species was one of the first plants to be sent into space, sent on a resupply to the Soviet Salyut 1 space station in 1979. The majority of kalanchoes require around 6-8 hours of sunlight a day; a few cannot tolerate this, and survive with bright, indirect sunlight to bright shade.

Description
Most are shrubs or perennial herbaceous plants, but a few are annual or biennial.

Kalanchoes open their flowers by growing new cells on the inner surface of the petals to force them outwards, and on the outside of the petals to close them. Kalanchoe flowers are divided into 4 sections with 8 stamens. The petals are fused into a tube, in a similar way to some related genera such as Cotyledon.

Taxonomy
The genus Kalanchoe was first described by the French botanist Michel Adanson in 1763.

The genus Bryophyllum was described by Salisbury in 1806 and the genus Kitchingia was created by Baker in 1881. Kitchingia is now regarded as a synonym for Kalanchoe, while Bryophyllum has also been treated  as a separate genus, since species of Bryophyllum appear to be nested within Kalanchoe on molecular phylogenetic analysis, Bryophyllum is considered as a section of the former, dividing the genus into three sections, Kitchingia, Bryophyllum, and Eukalanchoe. these were formalised as subgenera by Smith and Figueiredo (2018).

Etymology
Adanson cited Georg Joseph Kamel (Camellus) as his source for the name. The name came from the Cantonese name 伽藍菜 (Jyutping: gaa1 laam4 coi3).

Kalanchoe ceratophylla and Kalanchoe laciniata are both called  (apparently "Buddhist monastery [samghārāma] herb") in China.  In Mandarin Chinese, it does not seem very close in pronunciation (qiélán cài, but possibly jiālán cài or gālán cài as the character  has multiple pronunciations), but the Cantonese gālàahm choi is closer.

List of selected species

Kalanchoe adelae
Kalanchoe arborescens
Kalanchoe beauverdii
Kalanchoe beharensis – velvet leaf, felt plant, felt bush
Kalanchoe bentii
Kalanchoe blossfeldiana – flaming katy, Christmas kalanchoe, florist kalanchoe, Madagascar widow's-thrill
Kalanchoe bouvetii
Kalanchoe bracteata
Kalanchoe brasiliensis
Kalanchoe ceratophylla
Kalanchoe crenata
Kalanchoe crundallii
Kalanchoe daigremontiana – Devil's backbone, Mexican-hat plant, mother of thousands
Kalanchoe delagoensis  
Kalanchoe dineshii
Kalanchoe dinklagei
Kalanchoe eriophylla
Kalanchoe fadeniorum
Kalanchoe farinacea
Kalanchoe fedtschenkoi
Kalanchoe figuereidoi
Kalanchoe flammea
Kalanchoe gastonis-bonnieri – donkey ears, life plant
Kalanchoe glaucescens
Kalanchoe garambiensis
Kalanchoe gracilipes
Kalanchoe grandidieri
Kalanchoe grandiflora
Kalanchoe hildebrantii – silver teaspoons
Kalanchoe humilis
Kalanchoe jongmansii
Kalanchoe kewensis
Kalanchoe laciniata
kalanchoe laetivirens
Kalanchoe lateritia
Kalanchoe laxiflora
Kalanchoe linearifolia 
Kalanchoe longiflora – long-flower kalanchoe
Kalanchoe luciae – paddle plant
Kalanchoe macrochlamys
Kalanchoe manginii – beach bells
Kalanchoe marmorata – penwiper
Kalanchoe marnieriana
Kalanchoe millotii
Kalanchoe miniata
Kalanchoe mortagei
Kalanchoe nyikae
Kalanchoe obtusa
Kalanchoe orgyalis
Kalanchoe petitiana
 Kalanchoe pinnata (Lam.) Pers.
Kalanchoe porphyrocalyx
Kalanchoe prasina
Kalanchoe prolifera
Kalanchoe pubescens
Kalanchoe pumila
Kalanchoe quartiniana
Kalanchoe rhombopilosa – pies from heaven
Kalanchoe robusta
Kalanchoe rolandi-bonapartei
Kalanchoe rosei
Kalanchoe rotundifolia
Kalanchoe schizophylla
Kalanchoe serrata
Kalanchoe sexangularis
Kalanchoe streptantha
Kalanchoe suarezensis
Kalanchoe synsepala – cup kalanchoe, walking kalanchoe
Kalanchoe thyrsiflora – flapjacks, desert cabbage, white lady, geelplakkie, meelplakkie, plakkie
Kalanchoe tomentosa – panda plant
Kalanchoe uniflora
Kalanchoe producta
Kalanchoe viguieri

List of hybrids
Several hybrids within Kalanchoe are known:
 K. houghtonii = K. daigremontiana × K. delagoensis
 K. lokarana
 K. poincarei
 K. rechingeri
 K. richaudii = K. delagoensis × K. rosei

Distribution and ecology 
The genus is predominantly native to the Old World. Only one species originates from the Americas. 56 are from southern and eastern Africa and 60 species on the island of Madagascar. It is also found in south-eastern Asia and China.

These plants are food plants for caterpillars of the Red Pierrot butterfly. The butterfly lays its eggs on phylloclades, and after hatching, caterpillars burrow into the phylloclades and eat their inside cells.

Cultivation and uses

These plants are cultivated as ornamental houseplants and rock or succulent garden plants.  They are popular because of their ease of propagation, low water requirements, and wide variety of flower colors typically borne in clusters well above the phylloclades. The section Bryophyllum—formerly an independent genus—contains species such as the "air-plant" Kalanchoe pinnata. In these plants, new individuals develop vegetatively as plantlets, also known as bulbils or gemmae, at indentations in phylloclade margins. These young plants eventually drop off and take root. No males have been found of one species of this genus which does flower and produce seeds, and it is commonly called the mother of thousands: Kalanchoe daigremontiana is thus an example of asexual reproduction.

The cultivars ‘Tessa’ and ‘Wendy’ have gained the Royal Horticultural Society’s Award of Garden Merit.

Diseases

Traditional medicine 
In traditional medicine, Kalanchoe species have been used to treat ailments such as infections, rheumatism and inflammation. Kalanchoe extracts also have immunosuppressive effects. Kalanchoe pinnata has been recorded in Trinidad and Tobago as being used as a traditional treatment for hypertension.

A variety of bufadienolide compounds have been isolated from various Kalanchoe species. Five different bufadienolides have been isolated from Kalanchoe daigremontiana. Two of these, daigremontianin and bersaldegenin 1,3,5-orthoacetate, have been shown to have a pronounced sedative effect. They also have the strong positive inotropic effect associated with cardiac glycosides, and with greater doses an increasing effect on the central nervous system.

Bufadienolide compounds isolated from Kalanchoe pinnata include bryophillin A which showed strong anti-tumor promoting activity, and bersaldegenin-3-acetate and bryophillin C which were less active. Bryophillin C also showed insecticidal properties.

In Popular Culture 
Kalanchoe play a major role in the Japanese anime and manga series The Yakuza's Guide to Babysitting.

References

Bibliography

External links

 
Flora of Southern Africa
Medicinal plants of Africa
Space-flown life
Taxa named by Michel Adanson
Crassulaceae genera